Renato Paratore (born 14 December 1996) is an Italian professional golfer who plays on the European Tour. He competed at the 2020 Summer Olympics.

Amateur career
As an amateur, Paratore had his breakthrough reaching the quarterfinals of the 2013 Amateur Championship at Royal Cinque Ports. Between 2013 and 2014 he won the Junior Orange Bowl in Miami, the Portuguese Amateur Championship, the Trofeo International Umberto Agnelli, the Italian Amateur Stroke Play Championship and the Men's Individual Gold at Youth Olympics. He played in the Junior Ryder Cup twice.

In November 2014, at 17 years of age (the youngest man in the field at European Tour Qualifying School), Paratore obtained his European Tour card.

Professional career
Paratore made his European Tour debut in December 2014 at the Alfred Dunhill Championship in Malelane, South Africa, where he finished tied for the 26th place. After a positive start to the season, where he made 7 consecutive cuts, he struggled to get more positive results. In July 2015 at the Open de France, he became the first player in European Tour history to score a four on every hole. He obtained the best result of his first season at the end of August with a 5th place at the D+D Real Czech Masters. Despite being disqualified in the final event of his season for signing an incorrect score, Paratore managed to finish 109th in the Race to Dubai, just enough to keep his card for 2017. Paratore earned his first European Tour win at the 2017 Nordea Masters.

In July 2020, Paratore won the Betfred British Masters by three strokes over Rasmus Højgaard.

Amateur wins
2014 Portuguese Amateur Championship, Trofeo International Umberto Agnelli, Italian Amateur Stroke Play, Men's Individual Gold at Youth Olympics

Professional wins (3)

European Tour wins (2)

European Tour playoff record (0–1)

Italian Pro Tour wins (1)

Results in major championships
Results not in chronological order in 2020.

CUT = missed the halfway cut
NT = No tournament due to COVID-19 pandemic

Results in World Golf Championships

"T" = Tied

Team appearances
Amateur
Junior Ryder Cup (representing Europe): 2012, 2014
Eisenhower Trophy (representing Italy): 2012, 2014
European Boys' Team Championship (representing Italy): 2013, 2014
Bonallack Trophy (representing Europe): 2014 (winners)
Jacques Léglise Trophy (representing the Continent of Europe): 2012 (winners), 2013

Professional
World Cup (representing Italy): 2018

See also
2014 European Tour Qualifying School graduates

References

External links

Italian male golfers
European Tour golfers
Olympic golfers of Italy
Golfers at the 2020 Summer Olympics
Golfers at the 2014 Summer Youth Olympics
Youth Olympic gold medalists for Italy
Sportspeople from Rome
1996 births
Living people